Julio Cesar Nava Garcia (born December 29, 1989, in Veracruz) is a Mexican professional footballer who plays as a left winger for Liga de Expansión MX club Tepatitlán.

Club career 
He made his debut in a 1–1 tie for Chivas on August 5, 2007, against UNAM Pumas. Nava was part of the Guadalajara squad that participated in the 2008 and 2012 Copa Libertadores.

On 30 August 2015, Nava returned to the fields after being banned, and he did it against his first club Guadalajara in an away match which Chiapas lost 4–1.
He usually plays as a left wing-back.

Doping ban 
Nava was banned from sport for 8 months in 2015, after testing positive for the glucocorticoid steroid betamethasone.

U-23 International Goals 

|-
|align=center| 1. || September 2, 2011 || Estadio Alfonso Lastras, San Luis Potosí, Mexico ||  || align=center|1-0 || align=center|1–3 || Friendly
|}

U-23 International appearances
As of 7 September 2011

References

External links

 Julio Nava's Statistics

1989 births
Living people
Footballers from Veracruz
People from Martínez de la Torre
Mexican footballers
Liga MX players
C.D. Guadalajara footballers
Querétaro F.C. footballers
Chiapas F.C. footballers
Atlas F.C. footballers
Doping cases in association football
Mexican sportspeople in doping cases
Association football wingers
2009 CONCACAF U-20 Championship players